General Leopold Okulicki (noms de guerre Kobra, Niedźwiadek; 1898 – 1946) was a general of the Polish Army and the last commander of the anti-Nazi underground Home Army during World War II. He was arrested after the war by the Soviet NKVD and died while imprisoned at Butyrka prison in Moscow.

Life 

Okulicki was born in November 1898 in Bratucice, Bochnia County in the Austrian section of partitioned Poland ("Galicia"). His exact date of birth is unknown as the birth record was not preserved in Polish archives and Okulicki himself used two dates: 11 November and 13 November. In 1910 he joined a local gymnasium, and after 1913 he was also an active member of the Związek Strzelecki. The following year, at the age of 16, after finishing basic military training, Okulicki passed his NCO exams. After the outbreak of World War I, in October 1915, he left school and volunteered for the Polish Legions, where he served with distinction in the 3rd Legions Infantry Regiment.

He remained in the Polish Army and fought in various units both during the Great War and the following Polish–Bolshevik War (1919–1921), decorated with the highest Polish military Order of Virtuti Militari. In the interwar period he remained in the army and in 1925 graduated from the prestigious Warsaw Military Academy. Afterwards Okulicki took a post in Grodno local corps headquarters. Until the late 1930s he taught at the Infantry Training Centre in Rembertów, and became commanding officer of Polish 13th Infantry Division.

Nazi occupation 
In 1939 he was made commander of one of the departments of the Polish Commander-in-Chief's Headquarters. After Edward Rydz-Śmigły evacuated his staff from Warsaw, Okulicki remained in the Polish capital and served in various posts during the Siege of Warsaw. After the capitulation of the Polish troops defending the capital, Okulicki evaded capture by the Germans and joined Służba Zwycięstwu Polski, one of the first underground resistance organizations formed in Nazi- and Soviet-occupied Poland. In January 1940 he moved to Łódź, where he assumed the post of commander of the local area of that organization. After a brief stint at Headquarters, he was transferred to Soviet-occupied Lwów and became head of that area.

Soviet period 

Arrested by the NKVD in January 1941, he was imprisoned and tortured in various Soviet prisons. Released after the Sikorski-Mayski Agreement of 1941, he joined the Polish Army re-created in the USSR, where he assumed the post of the chief of staff. After a brief period as the commanding officer of the Polish 7th Infantry Division he was moved to London for training in the Cichociemni training camp and then transported to occupied Poland. In July 1944, during Operation Tempest, he became the commander of the 2nd Echelon of the Home Army. General Bór-Komorowski, predicting his own arrest by the Soviets after the Warsaw Uprising named him his deputy and successor. Okulicki fought in the Uprising, among other posts as the chief of staff of the Home Army. After the capitulation of the Uprising, he managed to evade being captured by the Germans and moved to Kraków, from where he started to reorganize the Home Army. On 3 October 1944 he became the commander of the entire organization. On 19 January 1945, after the Soviet takeover of Poland, he ordered the disbandment of the Home Army, fearing that future existence of an Allied force in Poland would only lead to more people being murdered or arrested by the Soviets. Following an NKVD provocation, he was arrested and imprisoned in Moscow. 
According to him, "In comparison with the NKVD, the Gestapo methods are child's play."
Sentenced to 10 years' imprisonment in the staged Trial of the Sixteen, he died on 24 December 1946 at Butyrka prison. A cenotaph commemorating his death was built in the Powązki Military Cemetery, Warsaw.

Decorations 
Order of the White Eagle, posthumously on 11 November 1995 
Order Virtuti Militari Golden Cross
Order Virtuti Militari Silver Cross
Cross of Independence
Cross of Valour, 4 times
Cross of Merit with Swords Golden Cross
Legion of Merit, posthumously (USA)

References

External links
Gen. Leopold Okulicki Deposition for NKVD During the Trial of the Sixteen

1898 births
1946 deaths
People from Bochnia County
People from the Kingdom of Galicia and Lodomeria
Polish generals
Home Army members
Warsaw Uprising insurgents
Recipients of the Gold Cross of the Virtuti Militari
Recipients of the Cross of Independence
Recipients of the Cross of Valour (Poland)
Recipients of the Cross of Merit with Swords (Poland)
Foreign recipients of the Legion of Merit
Polish legionnaires (World War I)
Polish people of the Polish–Soviet War
Polish deportees to Soviet Union
Polish people who died in Soviet detention
Polish people detained by the NKVD
Recipients of the Order of the White Eagle (Poland)